Vurpillat's Opera House is a historic opera house located at Winamac, Pulaski County, Indiana. It was built in 1883, and is a three-story, rectangular, Second Empire style brick building with a mansard roof. It sits on a limestone foundation and features metal decorative details.

It was listed on the National Register of Historic Places in 2002.

References

External links

Theatres on the National Register of Historic Places in Indiana
Second Empire architecture in Indiana
Theatres completed in 1883
Buildings and structures in Pulaski County, Indiana
National Register of Historic Places in Pulaski County, Indiana